

On 15 October 1965 the Chilean   sank off Caleta Llico,  south of Corral, Chile, with the loss of 51 men.

 under command of Pedro Fierro Herreros was ordered to the periodic maintenance of the lighthouses but on 2 August, as bad weather threatened the ship, they were forced to take refuge in Caleta Manquemapu within Bahía San Pedro. As the anchor chain broke, the ship ran aground. The naval authorities immediately sent Janequeo under the command of Marcelo Léniz Bennet, to free Leucotón. On board was a rescue team of fixed men under the command of Claudio Hemmerdinger.

The crew of Leucotón made it safely to shore but despite days of effort, she could not be freed.
  

At 16:00 on 14 August, a tow-line got entangled in the propeller of Janequeo. Despite the intensive work of Hemmerdinger's frogmen, it was not possible to free the screw. That day Janequeo repeatedly struck the rock Campanario, and although still afloat, was partially flooded.

At 9:20 on 15 August, Janequeo broke in two. Only 28 men of the crew survived and made it safely to shore, but 51 men were lost.

Aftermath
On 15 September 1965 appeared the first edition of the Chilean magazine Punto Final with an analysis of the disaster of Janequeo. Journalist Miguel Torres accused the admiralty of the Chilean Navy for the disaster.

The Leucotón shipwreck is still rusting on the beach of Manquemapu.

The patrol boat Fuentealba (15 t), the landing ship Hemmerdinger (1500 t) and patrol boat Odger (215 t) of the Chilean Navy are named after three of the sailors who died in the disaster.

See also
 List of decommissioned ships of the Chilean Navy

References

External links
 Omar Valdivieso Véliz, Los Condenados de la Mar, retrieved on 25 September 2013
 Fotos of the ships in webarchiv of 
 Pamela Altamirano Cárdenas and Miriam Margarita Bernal Poblete Caleta Manquemapu

Chilean Navy
Maritime incidents in 1965
Shipwrecks in the Chilean Sea
1948 ships
1943 ships
1965 in Chile
Maritime incidents in Chile
History of Los Lagos Region
October 1965 events in South America
Coasts of Los Lagos Region